{{Infobox television
| image              = Sisters Who Make Waves logo.jpeg
| caption            = Series logo
| native_name        = 
| genre              = Reality
| director           = Yan Ji
| creative_director  = Wu Mengzhi
| presenter          = Huang Xiaoming
| starring           =
| country            = China
| language           = Mandarin
| num_seasons        = 3
| num_episodes       = 13
| executive_producer = 
| producer           = 
| camera             = Multi-camera
| runtime            = 94–208 minutes
| company            = 
| network            = Mango TV
| picture_format     = HDTV 1080i
| audio_format       = Stereophonic
| released           = 
| last_aired         = 
| followed_by        = Sisters Who Make Waves (season 2) (2021)| image_size         =  
}}Sisters Who Make Waves is a 2020 Chinese reality television show that was broadcast on Mango TV from 12 June to 4 September 2020. It features 30 female celebrities over 30 years old who must compete to debut in a seven-member girl group.

Concept 
Touting the catchphrase "Thirty dark horses, return to youth", Sisters Who Make Waves follows the general formula idol group reality shows like Produce 101 and Idol Producer, but with the twist that participants are already well-known and veteran celebrities and are all aged 30 and above, with an average age of 35+. The contestants are to live with each other for 3 months while partaking in intense training. Huang Xiaoming is the official presenter of the final group. Additional cast members include Du Hua as female group manager, Huo Wenxi as general counselor, Zhao Zhao as music producer and Chen Qiyuan as stage producer. After the show's end, the winning group starred in "Lady Land" which followed the behind-the-scenes journey to forming a group.

Contestants 
The contestants' English name is used in the list. If the English name is unknown, the pinyin version of the Chinese name is used. Top 7 contestants debuted as X-SISTER on the show's finale at 4 September 2020, but the announcement of disbandment was made on 1 January 2021, as members resume their own entertainment activities.

Notes:

 Most contestants have more than one occupation. Their main occupation is the one listed.

*Part of the revival group in the fifth performance

**Eliminated in 2nd Performance, Successfully revived in 5th performance

***Eliminated in 3rd Performance, Successfully Revived in 5th performance

Episodes

Episode 1 (June 12, 2020) 
In the first episode, 30 contestants performed a personal preliminary stage and were rated by three mentors: personal traits, group potential were scored by Du Hua, vocal performance was scored by Zhao Zhao, and stage performance was scored by Chen Qiyuan.

Results

Episode 2 (June 19, 2020) 
The contestants are then asked to pick one of six songs for their first group evaluations, with the people with the highest scores allowed to pick first. The six songs are "兰花草" by YinShia, "推开世界的门" by Faith Yang, "Beautiful Love" by Tanya Chua, "得不到的爱情" by Yao Lee, "艾瑞巴迪" by New Pants, and "大碗宽面" by Kris Wu.

Each of the six groups then practice for their respective song, with the performance order determined by the initial stage results.

Episode 3 (June 26, 2020) 
Among the three-member, five-member, and seven-member performance pairings, the members of the losing group may face elimination. During the performance, 500 audience vote between the two competing groups for each pairing. 6 contestants were temporarily eliminated: Wang Zhi, Adia Chen, Zhu Jing, Hai Lu, Liu Yun and Xu Fei.

Results

Episode 4 (July 3, 2020) 
For the second round of performances, the remaining sisters were first divided into eight groups of three by self-selection and mutual selection. The performance order is decided based on the total of the first-round audience favorite of each group member. The groups practice for the performances, with pre-performances judged beforehand, and the result determines which team will have an advantage in choosing their order of performance.

Episode 5 (July 10, 2020) 
As the second round performance commences, and the audience votes determined the final rankings of each team. The top three teams earned "safe team" status and all of its members moved on to the next round. Among the other five "dangerous teams", the four least popular sisters faced elimination.

Results

Episode 6 (July 17, 2020) 
After the second round of performance, the three most popular sisters from the audience and the last round of safety team leader became captains of this round. This round of performance was divided into four groups of five people. At the same time, a personal battle was added to opening performance, and each group sent a sister to participate, they were Meng Jia, Wang Feifei, Li Si Dan Ni and Baby Zhang. The four sister representatives from each group challenged four different dance styles (Whacking, Power Jazz, Animation, African Dance) incorporated into the theme song of the show "Ms. Priceless". The votes garnered from their individual performances were added to the team battle to determine their rankings.

Episode 7 (July 24, 2020) 
In the performance, the combination with the highest number of votes for individual and team battles all advanced, and the three sisters who ranked lowest in the audience's favor among the remaining combinations are temporarily suspended from the competition.

Episode 8 (July 31, 2020) 
For the fourth round performance, the sisters were sorted into two teams of five and a team of seven. The teams configurations remain largely unchanged. As their outstanding performance in the previous round earned them a "safe team" status, Wan Qian's team had the privilege of first pick, and they collectively decided to stay together for this round. Lan Yingying crossed over to fill Wang Likun's space in the previously Ning Jing-led group (led this round by Yisa Yu), while the rest of the sisters automatically form a team of seven, led by Zhang Yuqi.

This round includes two parts, a team performance, and a band collaboration with the popular Chinese pop-punk band, New Pants.

Episode 9 (August 7, 2020) 

After the votes for both performances were combined, the Yisa Yu's group came up on top, earning "safe team" status, which meant all her group members automatically qualify for the next round. Wan Qian and Zhang Yuqi's group members faced elimination based on individual popularity votes. For this round, three sisters, namely Cindy Yen, Zhang Meng, and Wu Xin were eliminated.

The group configurations underwent reshuffling for the final time, meaning the groups were to be formed will stay the same for the rest of the competition. The group configuration for the next round was two seven-member groups. The selection of leaders for this round was based on sisters' votes, two sisters with the highest number of votes will automatically become captains of the two groups. After the vote count, Ning Jing became the first leader with the highest number of votes, while Lisi Dani and Wang Feifei were tied at second place. After taking into account individual popularity votes, Li Si Dan Ni became the second leader.

The other sisters were split into two groups to meet the two new leaders, Ning Jing and Li Si Dan Ni, for a quick chat. Both the leaders and sisters can express their intention as to whether or not they would like to join their groups. An obvious popular choice for both groups was Wang Feifei, due to her incredible dance skills and vast girl-group experience, which led both leaders begging for her to pick their groups. The final group configurations are:

Group 1: Ning Jing (Leader), Wang Feifei, Michelle Bai, Lan Yingying, Huang Shengyi, Yisa Yu and Yumiko Cheng

Group 2: Li Si Dan Ni (Leader), Wan Qian, Gina Jin, Baby Zhang, Zhang Yuqi, Isabelle Huang and Annie Yi

Other than these two groups, there will be a third group which consists of 7 sisters who were eliminated, but voted back by netizens. Together they form a "revival group" that will later pose a formidable challenge to the two existing groups.

Episode 10 (August 14, 2020) 
The fifth round of performance saw a change in format as the show welcomed back a 7-member revival group. The 7 members were picked from a list of sisters who were eliminated in previous rounds, based on netizens vote, they are A Duo, Meng Jia, Shen Mengchen, Wu Xin, Jin Sha, Zhu Jingxi and Wang Zhi.

This round of performance was divided into two sections. First is an individual battle performance, the show producers provided a list of seven different songs and each member of each group must perform one of them. Li Si Dan Ni and Ning Jing's groups are considered to be Championship Candidate Groups and they will battle against the revival group. In this round, the sisters from the revival group have the privilege to pick who they'd like to challenge from the Championship Candidate Groups. If the revival group wins this battle, they are entitled to a revival spot, which also means one other sister still in the main competition will be eliminated.

The second section is the group performance similar to previous rounds. If the revival group finishes first place, they will be entitled to receive two revival spots, finishing second will give them one revival spot, while finishing last would indicate failure of revival.

Episode 11 (August 21, 2020) 
The episode shows the second part of the fifth round performance. 

Due to the revival group's outstanding individual battle win and a second-place finish in the group performance, there are entitled to two revival spots. A Duo and Meng Jia successfully revived based on audience votes, while the Michelle Bai and Huang Shengyi faced elimination. A Duo and Meng Jia automatically joined Ning Jing's group. The final group configurations for final round of performance are as follows:

Group 1: Li Si Dan Ni (Leader), Wan Qian, Gina Jin, Baby Zhang, Zhang Yuqi, Isabelle Huang and Annie Yi

Group 2: Ning Jing (Leader), Wang Feifei, Meng Jia, Lan Yingying, A Duo, Yisa Yu and Yumiko Cheng

Episode 12 (August 28, 2020) 
The sixth round of performance requires each group to perform three songs, two vocal-based and one dance-based. The selection of the songs shall be discussed by each team with the production team. They will then perform each song in groups of 3, 5 and 7.

Episode 13-Championship Group Formation Night (September 4, 2020) 
After four months of exciting performances, the time has come to reveal the sisters who will debut as a 7-member group. The selection of the 7 sisters is done through several rounds of voting based on multiple performances throughout the show as well as individual popularity.

Through each of the four rounds, 1, 2, 2, and 2 debuting spots will be given (respectively). Each team earns either 1 or 2 spots each round by getting more votes in the round.

Round 1: The leaders from each team goes up to the podium to announce the number of votes received for each of their three songs performed during Episode 12. Whichever group received the most points combined from the three songs will get one debuting spot.

Round 2:

Round 3:

Round 4:

The seven sisters who Debuted are:

1. Ning Jing

2. Regina Wan

3. Meng Jia

4. Sdanny Lee - X Leader

5. Zhang Yu Qi

6. Yisa Yu

7. Isabelle Huang

The final night was aired live on Hunan Entertainment Broadcasting Channel as well as MangoTV. Acclaimed journalist and talk show host Yang Lan joined Huang Xiaoming as hosts. Original singer of the show's theme song Li Yuchun aka Chris Lee was present to perform the theme song, flanked by all 30 sisters, in a Victoria's Secret runway-like stage. Other performing celebrities include Cai Xukun, Jason Zhang, NEXT (Chinese band), and a variation of performances from the 30 sisters themselves. Also present were the likes of Li Chen (actor), Yin Zheng (actor), Ayanga, Oscar Sun Jian, Zhou Shen and several key members of the Chinese Women's Volleyball Team.

Soundtrack 
"Ms. Priceless (无价之姐)" was written and sung by Chris Lee, and was released on June 18, 2020. It serves as the show's theme song.

International broadcast

References

External links 

 Sisters Who Make Waves on Weibo
 Sisters Who Make Waves on Douban

Singing talent shows
Chinese music television series
Mandopop
2020 Chinese television series debuts
Chinese television shows
Mandarin-language television shows
2020 Chinese television series endings
2020 in Chinese music
Hunan Broadcasting System original programming
Mango TV original programming